In geometry, the regular skew polyhedra are generalizations to the set of regular polyhedra which include the possibility of nonplanar faces or vertex figures. Coxeter looked at skew vertex figures which created new 4-dimensional regular polyhedra, and much later Branko Grünbaum looked at regular skew faces.

Infinite regular skew polyhedra that span 3-space or higher are called regular skew apeirohedra.

History
According to Coxeter, in 1926 John Flinders Petrie generalized the concept of regular skew polygons (nonplanar polygons) to regular skew polyhedra.

Coxeter offered a modified Schläfli symbol  for these figures, with  implying the vertex figure,  -gons around a vertex, and -gonal holes. Their vertex figures are skew polygons, zig-zagging between two planes.

 

A first set , repeats the five convex Platonic solids, and one nonconvex Kepler–Poinsot solid:
 {| class=wikitable
! 
!Faces
!Edges
!Vertices
!
!Polyhedron
!Symmetryorder
|- BGCOLOR="#e0f0e0" align=center
| {3,3| 3} = {3,3} || 4||6||4 || 0|| Tetrahedron||12
|-  BGCOLOR="#f0e0e0" align=center
| {3,4| 4} = {3,4} ||8||12||6 || 0|| Octahedron||24
|-  BGCOLOR="#e0e0f0" align=center
| {4,3| 4} = {4,3} ||6||12||8 || 0|| Cube||24
|-  BGCOLOR="#f0e0e0" align=center
| {3,5| 5} = {3,5} ||20||30||12 || 0||Icosahedron||60
|-  BGCOLOR="#e0e0f0" align=center
| {5,3| 5} = {5,3} ||12||30||20 || 0|| Dodecahedron||60
|- BGCOLOR="#e0f0e0" align=center
| {5,5| 3} = {5,5/2} ||12||30||12 || 4|| Great dodecahedron||60
|}

Finite regular skew polyhedra

Coxeter also enumerated the a larger set of finite regular polyhedra in his paper "regular skew polyhedra in three and four dimensions, and their topological analogues".

Just like the infinite skew polyhedra represent manifold surfaces between the cells of the convex uniform honeycombs, the finite forms all represent manifold surfaces within the cells of the uniform 4-polytopes.

Polyhedra of the form {2p, 2q | r} are related to Coxeter group symmetry of [(p,r,q,r)], which reduces to the linear [r,p,r] when q is 2. Coxeter gives these symmetry as [[(p,r,q,r)]+] which he says is isomorphic to his abstract group (2p,2q|2,r). The related honeycomb has the extended symmetry [[(p,r,q,r)]].

{2p,4|r} is represented by the {2p} faces of the bitruncated {r,p,r} uniform 4-polytope, and {4,2p|r} is represented by square faces of the runcinated {r,p,r}.

{4,4|n} produces a n-n duoprism, and specifically {4,4|4} fits inside of a {4}x{4} tesseract.

A final set is based on Coxeter's further extended form {q1,m|q2,q3...} or with q2 unspecified: {l, m |, q}. These can also be represented a regular finite map or {l, m}2q, and group Gl,m,q.

Higher dimensions
Regular skew polyhedra can also be constructed in dimensions higher than 4 as embeddings into regular polytopes or honeycombs. For example, the regular icosahedron can be embedded into the vertices of the 6-demicube; this was named the regular skew icosahedron by H. S. M. Coxeter. The dodecahedron can be similarly embedded into the 10-demicube.

See also
Skew polygon
Infinite skew polyhedron

Notes

References
 Peter McMullen, Four-Dimensional Regular Polyhedra, Discrete & Computational Geometry September 2007, Volume 38, Issue 2, pp 355–387
Coxeter, Regular Polytopes, Third edition, (1973), Dover edition, 
Kaleidoscopes: Selected Writings of H. S. M. Coxeter, edited by F. Arthur Sherk, Peter McMullen, Anthony C. Thompson, Asia Ivic Weiss, Wiley-Interscience Publication, 1995,  
 (Paper 2) H.S.M. Coxeter, "The Regular Sponges, or Skew Polyhedra", Scripta Mathematica 6 (1939) 240-244.
 (Paper 22) H.S.M. Coxeter, Regular and Semi Regular Polytopes I, [Math. Zeit. 46 (1940) 380–407, MR 2,10]
 (Paper 23) H.S.M. Coxeter, Regular and Semi-Regular Polytopes II, [Math. Zeit. 188 (1985) 559–591]
Coxeter, The Beauty of Geometry: Twelve Essays, Dover Publications, 1999,    (Chapter 5: Regular Skew Polyhedra in three and four dimensions and their topological analogues, Proceedings of the London Mathematics Society, Ser. 2, Vol 43, 1937.)
Coxeter, H. S. M. Regular Skew Polyhedra in Three and Four Dimensions. Proc. London Math. Soc. 43, 33-62, 1937.
Garner, C. W. L. Regular Skew Polyhedra in Hyperbolic Three-Space. Can. J. Math. 19, 1179-1186, 1967.
 E. Schulte, J.M. Wills On Coxeter's regular skew polyhedra, Discrete Mathematics, Volume 60, June–July 1986, Pages 253–262

Polyhedra